Oscar Jan Bengt Christiansson, known as Arc North, (born 1 June 1997) is a Swedish DJ and music producer. He participated in Melodifestivalen 2023 with the song "Where You Are (Sávežan)" along with Jon Henrik Fjällgren and Adam Woods.

Dicography

Singles

References

External links 

1997 births
Living people
Melodifestivalen contestants of 2023